The merger of Paris Métro Line 3bis and Line 7bis is projected to create a new line of the Paris Métro, from Château-Landon station to Gambetta station. This new line would extend westward beyond Line 7bis's current terminus at Louis Blanc.

History

The formation of the bis lines 

Line 3bis used to be part of the extension of Line 3 from Gambetta to Porte des Lilas, which opened on 27 November 1921. Line 3bis came into existence on 27 March 1971, when the RATP disconnected the branch ahead of the re-routing of the eastern end of Line 3 from Gambetta to Gallieni.

Line 7bis used to be part of the northern branch of Line 7 from Louis Blanc to Pré Saint-Gervais (via a three-station single-track loop), which opened on 18 January 1911. Line 7bis came into existence on 3 December 1967, when the RATP spun-off the branch due to low traffic.

The Navette 

The Navette on the Paris Métro was a single-track shuttle that operated between Porte des Lilas and Pré Saint-Gervais, using the titular Voie Navette. The shuttle connected Line 7 (at Pré Saint-Gervais) with Lines 3 and 11 (at Porte des Lilas), and had no intermediate stations.

The shuttle first operated from 27 November 1921 until the outbreak of World War II on 2 September 1939, with a single train running back and forth between the two stations on the Voie Navette. After the war, the RATP reopened the shuttle as a prototype rubber-tyred metro line from 13 April 1952 until 31 May 1956, with a single MP 51 car running back and forth as well.

The shuttle was supposed to be part of the extension of the then-northern branch of Line 7 from Pré Saint-Gervais to Porte des Lilas, where it would meet up with the then-eastern terminus Line 3. The planned extension consisted of two connecting tracks, the Voie Navette and Voie des Fêtes, that converged at the new Cinéma platforms at Porte des Lilas: the extension also included a new southbound-only station on the Voie des Fêtes, called Haxo.

Although the CMP completed the connecting lines and the platforms of Haxo and Porte des Lilas, they never fully opened the extension. Only the Voie Navette saw passenger service, and Haxo became a notable ghost station.

Today, the Voie des Fêtes is a service connection between Line 3bis and Line 7bis, and the Voie Navette is part of a small maintenance facility for the MF 88 fleet of Line 7bis.

Projected new line
It would result from the merger of:
 Line 3bis which currently links Gambetta station (where it branches from Line 3) to Porte des Lilas station, on the south-eastern (south to north) part of the new line;
 Line 7bis which currently performs an anticlockwise loop on its eastern end from Botzaris station to its terminus at Pré Saint-Gervais station, via Place des Fêtes station (but avoiding the closed station called Haxo); it would link them to the current western terminus at Louis Blanc station, on the northwestern (east to west) part of the new line.

These two lines would be connected through an existing rail tunnel, the Voie navette (currently used only for very limited technical servicing), between Porte des Lilas station and Pré Saint-Gervais station, to which it would be connected from the Place des Fêtes station by a short rail tunnel, the Voie des Fêtes (currently used and blocked by maintenance facilities), possibly by finally opening to the public the ghost station Haxo (but only in one direction), whose surface accesses would first need to be built. This would also mean reopening to traffic the secondary station Porte des Lilas – Cinéma and close the current platforms at Line 3bis's Porte des Lilas.

Line 7bis would be also extended one station to the west, to have its terminus at Château-Landon (for easing its interconnection with RER E at Magenta station, which would allow access to the Gare de l'Est and Gare du Nord via existing pedestrian links). Therefore, Louis Blanc station would no longer be the western terminus of the line; however, it would require the creation of a new tunnel and extensive works: this extension could therefore be finalised after the opening of the new line. For now, this last segment is used by the existing Line 7 connection.

It was originally speculated that the new line would be given the designation of Line 15. However, since a revision of the Grand Paris Express plans in which the Red Line became Line 15 and further planned lines were designated Line 16, 17 and 18, the merged line would likely be given the designation of Line 19.

See also
 Haxo (Paris Métro) – never-used station on the proposed line

Notes

References

External links
  Final project of the Schéma directeur de la région Île-de-France (SDRIF), adopted by the regional council of Île-de-France on 25 September 2008, p. 81 (paper version) left column, and p. 138 (paper version) right column. Last viewed on 3 October 2009 (p. 83 and p. 140 on the PDF version).

Proposed public transport in France
Paris Métro line 3bis
Paris Métro line 7bis